The Indianapolis mayoral election of 2015 took place on November 3, 2015. Voters elected the Mayor of Indianapolis, members of the Indianapolis City-County Council, as well as several other local officials. Incumbent Republican Greg Ballard did not run for re-election to a third term in office. Primary elections were held on May 5, 2015, with the Democrats nominating former secretary of state of Indiana and United States Attorney Joe Hogsett. Republicans nominated former Marine Chuck Brewer to face Hogsett.

The 2015 Indianapolis City-County elections took place alongside the mayoral election. This would be the first election for the council without the four at-large seats, which were eliminated by the Indiana General Assembly. Democrats also won control of the council, with a 13–12 majority – only the second time since the formation of Unigov in 1970 that the Democrats will have complete control of city government. They also swept all elected city and county offices for the first time since the formation of Unigov. This meant that, for the first time since the creation of the Unigov, the Democratic Party would control both the Indianapolis mayoralty and City Council.

Republican primary
Ahead of the primary, Brewer was seen as having strong odds of winning the Republican nomination.

Candidates

Declared
 Jocelyn-Tandy Adande, perennial candidate
 Chuck Brewer, businessman
 Terry Michael, real estate broker, former trustee of Fall Creek Township and candidate for the state senate in 2008
 Darrell Morris, firefighter and candidate in 2007
 Larry Shouse, janitor and candidate in 2007

Withdrew
 Olgen Williams, deputy mayor of Indianapolis

Declined
 Greg Ballard, incumbent mayor
 J. Murray Clark, former state senator, former chairman of the Indiana Republican Party and nominee for Lieutenant Governor of Indiana in 2000
 Charles Harrison, pastor and president of the Indianapolis Ten Point Coalition
 Richard Hite, Chief of the Indianapolis Metropolitan Police Department
 Ben Hunter, Indianapolis City-County Councilman
 Scott Keller, former Indianapolis City-County Councilman and nominee for the state house in 2012
 James W. Merritt, state senator
 Troy Riggs, Indianapolis Director of Public Safety
 Ryan Vaughn, president of Indiana Sports Corp. and former chief of staff to Mayor Ballard

Results

Democratic primary
Ahead of the primary, Hogsett was seen as having strong odds of capturing the Democratic nomination.

Candidates

Declared
 Joe Hogsett, former United States Attorney for the Southern District of Indiana and former secretary of state of Indiana
 Larry Vaughn, community activist

Withdrew
 Ed DeLaney, state representative
 Frank Short, Washington Township Trustee and former Indianapolis City-County Councilman (endorsed Hogsett)

Declined
 John Barth, Indianapolis City-County Councilman
 Charles Harrison, pastor and president of the Indianapolis Ten Point Coalition
 Maggie Lewis, president of the Indianapolis City-County Council (endorsed Hogsett)
 Brian Mahern, former Indianapolis City-County Councilman
 Vop Osili, Indianapolis City-County Councilman and nominee for Secretary of State of Indiana in 2010

Results

Libertarian nomination

Candidates

Declined
 Charles Harrison, pastor and president of the Indianapolis Ten Point Coalition

Independents

Candidates

Dropped out
 Sam Carson, businessman, Democratic candidate for mayor in 2011, son of former U.S. Representative Julia Carson and uncle of U.S. Representative André Carson

Declined
 Charles Harrison, pastor and president of the Indianapolis Ten Point Coalition

General election
Hogsett was seen as having strong odds of winning the election.

Results

References

External links
 Chuck Brewer for Mayor
 Joe Hogsett for Mayor

2015
2015 United States mayoral elections
2015 Indiana elections